Castle View School is a comprehensive school for ages 11–16 located on Canvey Island in Essex, England, sited on the old Furtherwick School site in the Centre of Canvey town centre. As of 2006, it has some 900 pupils and 200 staff.

Castle View is named after the fact that from the original site in Meppel Avenue, Canvey Island, there was a clear view of the remains of Hadleigh Castle.

Castle View School's current Headteacher is Mr Steve Durkin (appointed in 2016), the Deputy Headteacher is Mr A Sappong. 
The Assistant Headteachers are Mrs. K. McKenzie, Mr. D. Boughtwood and the School Business Manager Mr. K. Evans.

On 11 May 2009, the school was closed to pupils for a week due to a suspected outbreak of 'Swine Flu'. However, as only a small number of suspected cases emerged (along with an even smaller number of confirmed cases), the school was open for last year pupils to take their GCSE (General Certificates of Secondary Education) examinations. Pupils were noted on the school's website for having dealt with the situation maturely.

Castle View School was moved to a brand new building located at Foksville Road in the Centre of Canvey town in January 2012. Until that time, Key Stage 3 pupils were located in a self-contained area at the site of the new building, but screened from the building work which was in its final stages at the end of 2011. Key Stage 4 pupils were located at the Meppel Avenue site until the new building was completed.

Athlete Jessica Judd attended Castle View School; she is a top 800m female athlete.

A small portion of the old Castle View School site, part of the Sheridan pitch, the playground and the "chestnut green" has been used to build a new vocational education centre.

The entirety of the old building still stands to this day, with no-one buying what Prospects did not use and has been used for police training.

Contrary to sensationalised news reports in March 2013 the school did not ban triangular shaped flapjacks for health and safety reasons. In a light-hearted response to requests for comments on the reports, the Health and Safety Executive said of the decision "We often come across half-baked decisions taken in the name of health and safety, but this one takes the biscuit."

The school converted to academy status on 1 October 2014.

References

External links
 Essex BSF Schools

Secondary schools in Essex
Canvey Island
Academies in Essex